Sesso e volentieri is a 1982 Italian anthology-comedy film directed by Dino Risi. The film consists in ten segments, all starred by Johnny Dorelli and all having sex and sexual perversions as main theme.

Cast 
 Johnny Dorelli: marito/fidanzato/Erminio Pacilli/Dott. Franceschi/cliente/corteggiatore/Giacomo Giovanardi/Stelio Rafazzoni/sposino
 Laura Antonelli: Carla De Dominicis/giovane procace donna/princess
 Gloria Guida: fidanzata/moglie/centralinista telefonica/amante/sposina
 Giuliana Calandra: Carla's mom
 Margaret Lee: Jane McDonald
 Yorgo Voyagis: the suitor
 Jackie Basehart: the prince
 Giucas Casella: himself
 Pippo Santonastaso: the jealous barber
 Venantino Venantini
 Renato Scarpa

See also       
 List of Italian films of 1982

References

External links

1982 films
Films directed by Dino Risi
Films scored by Fred Bongusto
Commedia sexy all'italiana
1980s sex comedy films
Films set in Rome
Films set in Sardinia
1982 comedy films
1980s Italian films